SS Hartlebury was a cargo steamship that was launched in Scotland in 1934 for J&C Harrison Ltd. A U-boat sank her in the Barents Sea in 1942 when Hartlebury was a member of the Arctic convoy Convoy PQ 17.

Building
From 1932 to 1934 Lithgows of Port Glasgow built a series of five sister ships for J&C Harrison Ltd of London. Harlingen was launched on 17 November 1932 and completed in January 1933. Hardingham was launched on 15 December 1932 and completed in February 1933. Harbledown was launched on 27 March 1933 and completed that May. Harpasa was launched on 5 December 1933 and completed in January 1934. Hartlebury was launched on 30 January 1934 and completed that March.

Hartlebury had a single screw. David Rowan and Co of Glasgow built her engines. Her main propulsion was a three-cylinder triple expansion steam engine. Exhaust steam from its low-pressure cylinder drove a low-pressure steam turbine, which in turn drove a steam compressor. Her turbine drove the same propeller as her piston engine.

Second World War service

Transatlantic voyages
Hartlebury spent the first two years of the Second World War making transatlantic crossings. Between November 1939 and July 1941 she took part in four HX convoys, bringing grain from the USA and Canada to the UK and Ireland. In 1940 and 1941 she also made two trips to bring grain from South America to Britain, on which she joined SL convoys from Freetown in Sierra Leone for the latter part of her voyage home. Hartleburys final transatlantic voyage was in September 1941, when she brought a cargo of steel from the US to the UK via Convoy SC 43 from Sydney, Nova Scotia to Liverpool.

Arctic voyages
In October 1941 Hartlebury was transferred to Arctic convoys. She took part in Convoy PQ 2 to Archangel in October 1941 and Convoy PQ 11 to Murmansk in February 1942.

By April 1942 all four of Hartleburys sister ships had been sunk by enemy action. A mine sank Hardingham in 1940. U-boats sank Harbledown and Harlingen in 1941. An air raid burned and sank Harpasa in April 1942.

In May 1942 Hartlebury left Britain with a cargo of 36 tanks, six other vehicles, seven aircraft and 2,409 tons of military stores. Convoy UR 26 took her from Loch Ewe in western Scotland to Hvalfjörður in US-occupied Iceland. There she joined Convoy PQ 17 to Archangel, which left Hvalfjörður on 27 March. German forces attacked PQ 17 from 2 July and sank two of its cargo ships on 4 July. The convoy was then ordered to scatter, and ships were ordered to head independently for Novaya Zemlya.

Loss
Hartlebury continued independently. The explosions killed six members of her crew and destroyed all but one of her lifeboats. Then at 1845 hrs a third torpedo hit her, and Hartlebury sank bow-first with 10 minutes.

Her remaining lifeboat tipped over when it was launched, dropping its occupants into the sea. Hartlebury had life-rafts as well as lifeboats. Her remaining crew jumped into the sea to try to reach her rafts. A total of 38 men were killed: 29 crew, seven DEMS gunners and two Royal Navy signalmen.

Harbleburys Master, Captain George W Stephenson, and 12 other survivors reached land at Pomorski Bay. Seven other survivors reached the US cargo steamship Winston-Salem, which was aground on North Gusini Shoal. A Soviet survey ship rescued the seven, then transferred them to the cargo motor ship Empire Tide. All 20 of Hartleburys survivors were transferred to the corvette , which landed them at Archangel on 25 July.

When Hartlebury was torpedoed, falling débris trapped Captain Stephenson. He was freed and survived, but died less than a year later from his head trauma.

References

1934 ships
Cargo ships of the United Kingdom
Maritime incidents in July 1942
Ships built on the River Clyde
Ships sunk by German submarines in World War II
Steamships of the United Kingdom
Shipwrecks in the Barents Sea
World War II merchant ships of the United Kingdom
World War II shipwrecks in the Arctic Ocean